Sarumal (also Romanized as Sarūmāl) is a village in Zherizhah Rural District, in the Central District of Sarvabad County, Kurdistan Province, Iran. At the 2006 census, its population was 207, in 57 families. The village is populated by Kurds.

References 

Towns and villages in Sarvabad County
Kurdish settlements in Kurdistan Province